The United States Men's Curling Championship is the annual men's national curling championship for the United States. It is run by the United States Curling Association (USCA) and typically held in conjunction with the Women's Championship. The champion is eligible to represent the United States at the World Men's Curling Championships if they also rank in the top 75 teams over the last two seasons in the World Curling Tour Order of Merit or have earned 40 points in the Order of Merit year-to-date rankings.

History 
The United States Men's Curling Championship was started when Marshall Field and Company was inspired to host an American equivalent to the popular Macdonald Brier in Canada. The first championship was held March 27 to 30, 1957 at the Chicago Stadium in Chicago, Illinois. Opening night of the championship included a performance by the Scotch Highlander band of University of Iowa, an all female bagpipe and drum band, and were televised by the local television channel WGN-TV. Ken Watson, three-time Canadian champion, was hired as the commissioner of play and tasked with overseeing the umpires. Ten teams from nine states and one territory (Alaska) competed in a round-robin tournament with Harold Lauber's team from Hibbing, Minnesota coming out victorious.

Marshall Field and Company again ran the Championship in 1958, held at the Milwaukee Arena in Milwaukee, Wisconsin. In 1959 the newly formed United States Curling Association took over the operations of the Championship while Marshall Field and Company continued on as a sponsor. That year's Championship was held in Green Bay, Wisconsin at the Brown County Memorial Arena.

In 1961 Frank Crealock and his team out of Seattle won the fifth National Men's Championship, earning them the opportunity to represent the United States at the 1961 Scotch Cup in Scotland. While it was the third year that the Scotch Cup, which would later become the World Men's Curling Championship, was held it was the first year that the United States was invited to compete. Crealock competed against the national champions from Canada and Scotland and after a double round-robin all three teams were tied with a 2–2 record. A playoff was held to break the tie and the United States lost to Canada to finish third. For many years after this the national champion would go on to represent the United States at the World Championships, though eligibility prerequisites were added in recent years. 

The 2021 Championship was originally planned to be held February 6–13 at the ImOn Ice Arena in Cedar Rapids, Iowa, and it would have been the first time the Men's National Championship was held in Iowa. But in August, 2020 the arena was damaged during a severe derecho storm. The ongoing COVID-19 pandemic caused delays in repairing the arena and in November, 2020 the USCA announced that an alternative host site would be found. Only a month later, the USCA announced another change to the 2021 Championship when they declared that all remaining 2020–21 events would be either cancelled or postponed until late spring 2021. This postponement delayed the Men's National Championship until after the 2021 World Men's Championship and so the 2020 champions, John Shuster's team, were selected to represent the United States. This gave the team the opportunity to compete at Worlds which they missed the previous year when the 2020 World Men's Championship was cancelled due to the COVID-19 pandemic. On March 29, 2021 it was announced that the 2021 Men's Championship will be held in conjunction with the Women's Nationals and Mixed Doubles Nationals in a bio-secure bubble at Wausau Curling Club in Wausau, Wisconsin in May, 2021.

Qualification 
The qualification methods and format of the championship has changed over time, but currently ten teams play in each championship.  Five spots are awarded to the top American teams in the World Curling Federation (WCF) World Team Ranking System at a particular date roughly two months out from the championship. Four spots are awarded to the top teams from a Challenge Round, open to all United States curlers. The final spot is awarded to a team from that year's Junior Championships, as selected by the USCA.

Previously the USCA's High Performance Program has had the ability to select two of the competitors from their pool of teams.

For the 2021 Championship the qualification methods were modified slightly due to impacts of the COVID-19 pandemic. The field was cut down to eight teams, included were the 2020 champion and runner-up, the top three teams in the WCF World Team Ranking System on September 1, 2020, and the top three teams from the Challenge Round. The tournament was later postponed to May 2021; as it falls after the 2021 World Men's Curling Championship, the 2020 winners will represent the United States in their place.

Format 
The current format begins with a complete nine game round robin where each of the ten teams play every other team. At the end of the round robin the top four teams qualify for the playoffs; if there is a tie for fourth place then a tiebreaker game is played. The playoffs are conducted in the page playoff format, a common playoff format in curling. In a page playoff the 1 seed and 2 seed play with the winner advancing straight to the championship game. The 3 seed and 4 seed teams play and the winner of that match plays the loser of the 1 vs 2 game. The winner of this third game advances to the championship to face the winner of the 1 vs 2 game.

Past champions
The location and champion of every men's national championship since it began in 1957:

Notes
  This column shows the results of the team representing the United States at the World Curling Championships. Based on the rules implemented by the United States Curling Association for the 2013–14 season, the United States team at the World Curling Championships is not necessarily the team that won the national championship.
  Record is for the 2021 World Men's Curling Championship. The 2020 World Men's Curling Championship was cancelled due to the COVID-19 pandemic.
  Record is for the 2022 World Men's Curling Championship. The 2022 US Championship was cancelled due to the COVID-19 pandemic.

Champions by state

Sportsmanship Award 
The Ann Brown Sportsmanship Award has been presented annually since 2007 to one male and one female athlete at the National Championships who are judged to best embody the USCA Spirit of Curling as voted on by their peers. The award is given in memory of Ann Brown, who was the first female president of the United States Curling Association and was the second female inductee into the USCA Hall of Fame.

See also
Scottish Men's Curling Championship
Tim Hortons Brier
United States Women's Curling Championship
Scotties Tournament of Hearts (Canada) 
Scottish Women's Curling Championship

References

External links
List of champions

Curling competitions in the United States
Curling
Curling
Recurring sporting events established in 1957